Microsoft Cognitive Toolkit, previously known as CNTK and sometimes styled as The Microsoft Cognitive Toolkit, is a deprecated deep learning framework developed by Microsoft Research. Microsoft Cognitive Toolkit describes neural networks as a series of computational steps via a directed graph.

See also
 Comparison of deep learning software
 ML.NET
 Open Neural Network Exchange

References

Further reading
 

Deep learning software
Free and open-source software
Free statistical software
Microsoft free software
Microsoft Research
Software using the MIT license
2016 software